Gino Maes (born 7 February 1957) is a Belgian former footballer who played as a left back. He spent the majority of his career with Club Brugge, for whom he played in the 1978 European Cup Final defeat to Liverpool. Maes also played for Cercle Brugge and SK Torhout.

Honours

Club

 Club Brugge

 Belgian First Division:  1976–77, 1977–78, 1979–80
 Belgian Cup: 1976–77, 1985–86; 1978-79 (finalists)
 Belgian Supercup: 1980, 1986
 European Champion Clubs' Cup: 1977–78 (runners-up)
 Jules Pappaert Cup: 1978
 Bruges Matins: 1979, 1981
 Japan Cup Kirin World Soccer: 1981

References

Living people
Club Brugge KV players
Cercle Brugge K.S.V. players
1957 births
Association football defenders
Belgian footballers
Footballers from Bruges